The Art of Elysium (TAOE), founded in 1997, is an American nonprofit organization that provides community arts programs and artist services. Headquartered in Los Angeles, California, it organizes monthly workshops in fashion, film/theater, music, and visual arts for communities facing challenges, while also rendering career resources for participating volunteer artists. In January 2016, the organization partnered with SAG-AFTRA and the American Film Institute to support President Obama's "Call to Arts" initiative to complete 1 million hours of mentorship for young artists.

In February 2016, TAOE and Rabbit Bandini Productions co-launched Elysium Bandini Studios, a non-profit film studio and streaming entertainment network established to help financially support the charity. The organization has received additional financial contributions from its fundraising initiatives. In 2018, it was reported as serving over 30,000 individuals per year.

History 
The Art of Elysium was established in 1997 by Jennifer Howell,  originally to provide arts programs for hospitalized children. The name was derived from Greek mythology, incorporating "Elysium", a synonym for heaven. TAOE started with 33 volunteer artists. Its initial workshops were offered at Children's Hospital Los Angeles. 

In January 2008, the organization initiated the Heaven gala, an annual fundraiser. The following year, in 2009, it expanded operations to New York City.  By 2012, the membership included 4,000 volunteer artists. The organization facilitated programs at 17 hospitals, hospices, special-needs schools and outpatient facilities in Los Angeles, and five hospitals in New York City. It later developed community programs for the elderly and homeless individuals. In December 2015, the organization announced a new chairman of the board, Timothy Headington, replacing Ryan Kavanaugh. In January 2016, it partnered with SAG-AFTRA and the American Film Institute to complete 1 million hours of mentorship for young artists.

In February 2016, TAOE and Rabbit Bandini Productions co-launched Elysium Bandini Studios (EBS), a nonprofit film studio and streaming entertainment network established to help financially support the charity. EBS raised $698,000 from an Indiegogo campaign to fund its initial three films. The studio's early film projects included Memoria and Yosemite. On January 9, 2017, its streaming network went live. The platform later featured a video series directed by Andrew Ondrejcak that included volunteer artists. In 2018, an EBS production, Obey Giant, won a Webby People's Voice Award in Film & Video – Documentary: Individual Episode Longform.

Programs

Community arts 
TAOE provides community arts programs in fashion, film/theater, music, and visual arts. The organization has partnered with hospitals, schools, homeless shelters and eldercare facilities. In 2018, it was reported to offer 110 programs per month and serve over 30,000 individuals per year.

Artist services 
TAOE renders artist services through events, career resources, and financial awards. The organization's "Art Salon" events feature artists' work. TAOE also established four awards for volunteers, the Amber Award for fashion designers, the Tahnee Award for filmmakers, the David Award for musicians/dancers, and the Jacques Award for visual artists.

Events

Annual Events 

 Heaven, initiated in 2008, is an annual fundraising gala held in Los Angeles. In 2009, the organization first presented the event's Visionary award for creative merit. The award recipient organizes the event design and curates an art installation with their own conceptualization of heaven. TAOE also established the Spirit of Elysium award for artists' community service.
 Pieces of Heaven, initiated in 2008, is an annual art auction fundraiser in Los Angeles.
 Little Pieces of Heaven is an arts showcase in Los Angeles that includes the artwork of community program participants.
 Genesis, initiated in 2009, is an annual art exhibit and concert fundraiser  in Los Angeles.
 Paradis, initiated in 2009, is an annual fundraiser  in Cannes, France.

Special Events 
 Cartier Love Day. In June 2009, for Cartier's fourth annual Love Day initiative, charity ambassador Eva Mendes designed a silk bracelet, the sale of which benefited The Art of Elysium.

 L'Wren Scott Amber Award. In March 2014, The Art of Elysium announced the creation of the L’Wren Scott Amber Award, which honors fashion designer L'Wren Scott and Amber, one of the first children with whom the organization worked. The award is given to emerging fashion designers, enabling them to donate their time and talents to hospitalized children, and offering them the opportunity to create a small line of clothing to benefit Elysium.

 Tiffany & Co. HardWear Collection Party. On April 26, 2017, a Tiffany & Co. jewelry preview party, hosted by actors Zoë Kravitz and Riley Keough, was held at The Art of Elysium’s Elysium Art Salons in Los Angeles.

Events during COVID 
While the organization was unable to hold its usual events during the height of the COVID-19 pandemic, it organized or participated in a number of alternative events and projects, including:

 DRIVEN: A Latinx Artist Celebration. A drive-thru exhibit at the Hollywood Palladium in October 2020 celebrating Latinx musicians and artists.

 Shepard Fairey art installation. A socially distanced mural display at the Hollywood Palladium featuring the work of artist and activist Shepard Fairey.

 Going Home: a picture show. A socially distanced installation featuring the work of immunocompromised artist Torie Zalben.

 Bourn Kind: The Tiny Kindness Project. The Art of Elysium co-produced a documentary short film about a Black-Jewish street artist who creates a mural project to celebrate kindness and foster connection in his community. The film had its world premiere at the 2022 Tribeca Festival. 

  NFT Projects. The organization participated in a number of NFT projects, including Nathaniel Parrott’s “How to Kill a Wildflower,” The Futureverse Foundation, Dree Hemingway's "On: Dreams," and Buffalo Trace Distillery's vintage whiskey auction.

Award recipients

References

External links 
 

Arts organizations established in 1997
Non-profit organizations based in Los Angeles
Arts organizations based in California
Art in Greater Los Angeles
1997 establishments in California